Jordi Badía Romero (11 November 1938 – 23 February 1984), also known as Jobaro, Jorge or Jorge B. Gálvez, was a Spanish comic artist.

He began his career in the 1950s, illustrating Spanish adventure and romance stories, often working with his brother, Enrique Badía Romero; they signed their joint work "Hnos. Badía" (Badía Brothers). In the 1960s and '70s he worked for British comics companies Fleetway Publications and  DC Thomson, including girls' comics Misty and Spellbound, illustrating Supercats for the latter. In the United States he contributed to Creepy in the 1970s and Tarzan in the '80s.

In 2019 his work for Misty was collected in a hardback graphic novel by the Treasury of British Comics.

References
Jordi Badía Romero at the Lambiek Comiclopedia

Spanish comics artists
1938 births
1984 deaths
People from Barcelona
20th-century Spanish artists
Artists from Barcelona